Rosenhøj (lit.: Rose-hill) is a public housing project in Viby J, a southern district of Aarhus, Denmark.

Rosenhøj consists of concrete apartment blocks, with a total of 808 rentals, built in 1967-70. The area underwent a thorough renovation in the years 2014-17, updating the buildings to contemporary climate regulations, and also adding 22 new rowhouse rentals and outdoor sports facilities among other improvements.

In the 2000's, Rosenhøj has been increasingly attractive to immigrants. In 2001, 22% of the inhabitants where immigrants; in 2008 more than 52% where immigrants. Nearly all of the inhabitants under the age of 18 has an immigrant background. The majority of immigrants in Rosenhøj comes from Afghanistan, Somalia and Turkey.

References

External links 

Aarhus Municipality.
Jyllands Posten - Den glemte ghetto (2005)

Viby J
Neighborhoods of Aarhus